The Ligier JS2 R is a racing car manufactured by French automobile manufacturer Ligier. Designed to solely be destined for racing with no road-legal version planned, the car is a homage to the original Ligier JS2 introduced in 1972.

Model information 

The JS2 R was introduced at the 2018 Paris Motor Show at the occasion of the 50th anniversary of the company. It is inspired by the Ligier JS2 which was introduced in 1972 and was cited as the car having the best power-to-weight ratio of the time and superior driving dynamics. The original JS2 finished second at the 1975 24 Hours of Le Mans in its class. The JS2 R borrows many design cues from the JS2. While it is designed to be an easy to drive race car like the original, there is no confirmation about plans for a road-legal variant.

The car utilises a Brembo braking system with 4 piston calipers front and aft with  front brake discs and  rear brake discs, double wishbone suspension with actuated push-rods at the rear along adjustable anti-rollbars and dampers and a driver focused interior designed to accommodate tall drivers with a heated windscreen as standard equipment.

The JS2 R is designed to have low running costs and easy maintenance.
The car can be homologated for FIA Group E category.
Test days were scheduled for November 2018 for prospective buyers.
Since 2020 the car competes in its own category in the "Ligier European Series" of racing.

Technical specifications 
Source:
Chassis: FIA homologated tubular steel chassis
 Bodywork: Fibreglass 
 Fuel tank: 100-litre FIA homologated
 Engine: 3.7-litre Ford Duratec V6 
 Max RPM: 7,000
 Max Power: 
 Position: rear, mid-mounted
 Transmission: 6-speed sequential manual
 Clutch: ZF centrifugal twin disc
 Brakes: Brembo braking system with 4 piston callipers front and aft with  front brake discs and  rear brake discs
 Wheels: 18-inch aluminium alloy wheels
 Suspension: Double wishbone with adjustable anti-rollbar and dampers

References 

Cars introduced in 2018
Ligier racing cars